The 1979 Copa del Rey Final was the 77th final of the Spanish cup competition, the Copa del Rey. The final was played at Vicente Calderón in Madrid on 30 June 1979. The match was won by Valencia CF, who beat Real Madrid 2 – 0. Valencia won the cup for the fifth time.

Road to the final

Match details

References

External links
 RSSSF.com

1979
Copa
Valencia CF matches
Real Madrid CF matches